I Break Chairs is Damien Jurado's fourth album, and first with his backing band, Gathered in Song.  The album was produced by the former lead singer of Pedro the Lion and  Headphones, David Bazan.

Track listing 
All songs written by Damien Jurado, except Air Show Disaster written by Josh Golden.
"Paperwings" – 2:55
"Dancing" – 4:02
"Birdcage" – 2:13
"Inevitable" – 2:11
"Air Show Disaster" – 2:24
"Never Ending Tide" – 4:44
"Big Deal" – 2:23
"The Way You Look" – 3:12
"Castles" – 2:25
"Like Titanic" – 3:26
"Parade" – 2:34
"Lose My Head" – 5:21

Personnel
Damien Jurado – guitar, vocals
Eric Fisher – guitar, glockenspiel, keyboards
Andrew Myers – drums, glockenspiel
Josh Golden - Bass, Guitar, Vocals
David Bazan – producer, engineer, mixing
Jesse LeDoux – design
Aaron Sprinkle	– mixing
Rick Fisher – mastering

Reception

Heather Phares of Allmusic writes that I Break Chairs "proves that [Damien Jurado] can rock with the best" and the music is "emotionally deep as it is musically diverse".  Andy Cockle of Dusted writes that Jurado "displays his golden throat, though the setting seems a bit different" and that the addition of his backing band, Gathered in Song, "allows Jurado to create hopeful pop after providing us with several albums of harrowing solitude".  Brad Haywood of Pitchfork Media laments "Jurado's prior three releases was honest, introspective, moody, sometimes peppy and sometimes heartbreaking. The new Jurado is none of those things" and "a return to normalcy would be welcome".  Colleen Delaney of  Stylus writes "it's too hard to compare I Break Chairs to anything because it's got that sort of timeless quality to it" and "it's bringing me back to the salad days [of indie pop] of 1992, 1993".

References

2002 albums
Damien Jurado albums
Sub Pop albums